Ken Stewart is a politician from British Columbia, Canada. Stewart won the riding of Maple Ridge-Pitt Meadows in the 2001 British Columbia general election.

Stewart ran unsuccessfully as the BC Liberal candidate for MLA in the constituency of Maple Ridge-Pitt Meadows in 1996, but again contested and won the seat during the BC Liberal sweep of 2001.  In 2005 he was defeated by the NDP's Michael Sather, and in 2009 he faced Sather again in a bit to retake the district.

References

British Columbia Liberal Party MLAs
Year of birth missing (living people)
Living people
21st-century Canadian politicians